Jennifer Winget (born 30 May 1985) is an Indian actress who primarily works in Hindi television along with Hindi films. She started her career as a child actor with the 1995 film Akele Hum Akele Tum and made her TV debut with Shaka Laka Boom Boom in 2002. She then portrayed Sneha Bajaj in Kasautii Zindagii Kay and Dr. Riddhima Gupta in Dill Mill Gayye. 

Winget established herself as one of the leading actresses of Indian television with her portrayal of Kumud Sundari Desai in Saraswatichandra, Maya Mehrotra in Beyhadh and Zoya Siddiqui in Bepannah. She made her web debut with ALT Balaji's Code M.

Early life
Winget was born on 30 May 1985 in Bombay, (present-day Mumbai), India. She is the daughter of a Punjabi mother and a Maharashtrian Christian father, and is often mistaken for a person of non-Indian origins due to her western first name.

Career

Winget started her career at the age of 15 in the 2000 film Raja Ko Rani Se Pyar Ho Gaya, and then appeared as a supporting actor in the Indian film Kuch Naa Kaho at the age of 18. Later, she went on to work in various Indian TV shows. Winget's big break as the lead in television came with the show Karthika, where she played the role of a struggling singer who dreams of making it big.

She later starred in Kasautii Zindagii Kay, where she played Sneha, the daughter of the protagonists. In 2009, she replaced Sukirti Kandpal as Riddhima Gupta in the show Dill Mill Gayye. In 2013 she starred in Sanjay Leela Bhansali's television show Saraswatichandra as Kumud Desai opposite Gautam Rode. For her performance she won the Indian Television Academy Award for Best Actress Critics. In 2016, Winget portrayed Maya Mehrotra in Sony TV's Beyhadh. For her performance she won numerous awards and appreciation. In 2018, she played the role of Zoya Siddiqui in Colors TV's Bepannaah opposite Harshad Chopda. She also portrayed the role of Maya Jaisingh in Sony TV's Beyhadh 2 during the early 2020s, opposite Ashish Chaudhary and Shivin Narang. However, the show got an abrupt ending due to coronavirus lockdown. Winget is one of highest paid Indian Television actresses.

Personal life

Winget married Karan Singh Grover on 9 April 2012. In November 2014, Winget stated that she and Grover had separated.

Media image

Winget has established herself as one of the most popular and highest paid television actress in India. She is widely noted for her powerful and impactful onscreen roles and performances. She ranked 5th in Rediffs Top 10 Television Actresses list of 2014.

In UK-based newspaper Eastern Eyes List of 50 Sexiest Asian Women, she ranked 21st in 2012. In 2013, she ranked 15th. In 2018, she ranked 13th. Winget became Times of Indias was ranked in Times 20 Most Desirable Women on Television List at 2nd in both 2017 and 2018. 

She has also been cover model for various magazines.

In 2022, Winget contributed to the fight for India’s elephants by spending three days volunteering with Wildlife SOS.

Filmography

Films

Television

Special appearances

Web series

Accolades

See also

 List of Hindi television actresses
 List of Indian television actresses
 List of Indian film actresses

References

External links

 
 

Living people
Indian soap opera actresses
Indian television actresses
Actresses in Hindi cinema
Actresses in Hindi television
1985 births
Indian Christians
People from Gurgaon
Actresses from Mumbai
Punjabi people
Marathi people